Hülya is a Turkish female name. It means "daydream" in Turkish.
 Hülya Avşar (born 1963), Turkish actress
 Hülya Koçyiğit (born 1947), Turkish actress
 Hülya Şenyurt (born 1973), Turkish female judoka
 Hülya Şahin (born 1974), Turkish female boxer
 Hülya Vurnal İkizgül (born 1966), Turkish mosaicist, sculptor and ceramic nothing
Mesude Hülya Şanes Doğru (born 1963), Turkish Academic

Turkish feminine given names